Paulo Jorge Sousa Gomes (born 4 March 1975) is a Portuguese retired footballer who played as a defensive midfielder.

He amassed Primeira Liga totals of 189 games and two goals during exactly ten seasons, representing mainly União de Leiria (five years) and Vitória de Guimarães (three) in the competition.

Football career
During his Portuguese career, Viseu-born Gomes represented Académico de Viseu FC, C.D. Tondela, A.D. Lousada, Vitória de Guimarães, S.C. Braga, U.D. Leiria, F.C. Paços de Ferreira and F.C. Penafiel. He made his Primeira Liga debut for Guimarães, against S.C. Salgueiros in a 2–3 away loss on 12 September 1998 – coach Zoran Filipović handed him his first chance.

Almost ten years later, Gomes contributed with two league games as Paços achieved an historical qualification to the UEFA Cup. He finished the season at second division side Penafiel, however.

Gomes moved abroad for the 2008–09 campaign, signing with Atromitos Yeroskipou in the Cypriot First Division and joining, among other compatriots, former Leiria teammate Hugo Costa. He subsequently returned to Portugal and Viseu (with the club now in the third level), retiring in June 2010 at the age of 35.

External links

1975 births
Living people
People from Viseu
Portuguese footballers
Association football midfielders
Primeira Liga players
Liga Portugal 2 players
Segunda Divisão players
Académico de Viseu F.C. players
C.D. Tondela players
A.D. Lousada players
Vitória S.C. players
S.C. Braga players
U.D. Leiria players
F.C. Paços de Ferreira players
F.C. Penafiel players
Cypriot First Division players
Atromitos Yeroskipou players
Portuguese expatriate footballers
Expatriate footballers in Cyprus
Portuguese expatriate sportspeople in Cyprus
Portuguese football managers
Académico de Viseu F.C. managers
Sportspeople from Viseu District